2S6 may refer to:
 A version of 9K22 Tunguska, a missile System
 Sportsman Airpark, in Newberg, Oregon, USA - FAA identifier